Smalltown Superjazzz is an independent record label based in Oslo, Norway, that concentrates on new forms of jazz. It is a subsidiary of the label Smalltown Supersound.

The catalog includes albums by Free Fall, Mats Gustafsson, The Thing

See also 
 List of record labels

External links
 Official site

Norwegian independent record labels
Record labels established in 2004